A frenectomy  is the removal of a frenulum, a small fold of tissue that prevents an organ in the body from moving too far. It can refer to frenula in several places on the human body. It is related to frenuloplasty, a surgical alteration in a frenulum. Done mostly for orthodontic purposes, a frenectomy is either performed inside the middle of the upper lip, which is called labial frenectomy, or under the tongue, called lingual frenectomy. Frenectomy is a very common dental procedure that is performed on infants, children, and adults. A similar procedure frenulotomy is where a tight frenulum may be relieved by making an incision in the tight tissue.

Types
There are several frenula that are associated with types of frenectomy:
 Genital frenectomy can be performed to remove frenulums from genitalia
 Lingual frenectomy (of the tongue) as a treatment for ankyloglossia (tongue-tie)
 Labial frenectomy (of the lip) is very common with patients undergoing denture treatment to get the proper fit of dentures or patients who have tissues attached to center of the upper lip and causing recession of gums or gap between the upper front teeth called central incisors.
 A frenectomy can also be performed to remove a section of tissue (the frenulum) that attached to the gingival tissue between two teeth.

Pediatric and infant frenectomies 
In the past, the frenectomy procedure was perhaps the most popular of soft tissue operations in younger patients. Many labial and lingual frenum (tongue- and lip-ties) were snipped by a midwife, family doctor or dental surgeon. The overall awareness and treatment of tongue- and lip-ties especially in breastfeeding infants has increased over recent years. Frenectomies are routinely performed on infants to improve breastfeeding outcomes.

In 2020, medical professionals raised the concern that a recent rise in unnecessary frenectomies on infants may be encouraged in part by information shared in online parenting groups. While public healthcare options (e.g. NHS) may not cover frenulectomies, in part due to these concerns, private clinic surgeries remain viable options for concerned parents.

Traditionally tongue-ties are diagnosed by appearance alone; newer research advocates for a functional assessment to determine any deleterious effect on breastfeeding. Before any surgical intervention for difficulties related to breastfeeding, preoperative consultation with a certified lactation consultant is recommended.

Laser frenectomy with CO2 surgical lasers 

Frenectomies can be safely and efficiently released with the soft tissue 10,600 nm CO2 laser with predictable and repeatable tissue response, fast ablation and instant hemostasis. The extremely precise cutting, minimal collateral damage, clear and bloodless operating field, make the CO2 laser a good choice for frenectomy procedures. CO2 laser oral surgery also features less wound contraction and reduced scarring or fibrosis in comparison with scalpel incisions.

References

Further reading 
 Lingual Frenectomy procedure, information and demonstration

Surgical removal procedures